Chantal Vandierendonck (born 31 January 1965) is a Dutch former professional wheelchair tennis player. Vandierendonck won various wheelchair tennis championships held by the International Tennis Federation and multiple Paralympic medals from 1988 to 1996. She was inducted into the International Tennis Hall of Fame in 2014.

Early life
Vandierendonck was born on 31 January 1965 in the Netherlands. She became a paraplegic after a car accident when she was eighteen.

Career
After meeting wheelchair tennis player Jean-Pierre Limborg in Paris, Vandierendonck began her tennis career at a French competition in 1983. In 1985, she won her first out of seven Super Series U.S. Open championships with her last win in 1993. Alternatively, Vandierendonck participated in the first team event at the ITF Wheelchair Tennis Tour in 1996 and co-won the ITF's women's doubles cup in 1997. During her time at the ITF in the 1990s, she was named ITF World Champion three times and won the Wheelchair Tennis Masters in 1996.

Outside of the ITF, Vandierendonck competed at the Paralympic Games for wheelchair tennis in both singles and doubles. Her first Paralympic medal was at the demonstration of wheelchair tennis at the 1988 Summer Paralympics. She won additional Paralympic medals at the 1992 Summer Paralympics and 1996 Summer Paralympics.

Awards and honours
In 2010, Vandierendonck was given the Brad Parks Award. After her nomination to the International Tennis Hall of Fame in 2013, Vandierendonck was inducted into the ITHF in 2014 as the first inductee in wheelchair tennis.

References

External links
 
 

1965 births
Living people
Paralympic wheelchair tennis players of the Netherlands
Dutch female tennis players
Wheelchair tennis players at the 1988 Summer Paralympics
Wheelchair tennis players at the 1992 Summer Paralympics
Wheelchair tennis players at the 1996 Summer Paralympics
People with paraplegia
Paralympic gold medalists for the Netherlands
Paralympic silver medalists for the Netherlands
Paralympic bronze medalists for the Netherlands
Paralympic medalists in wheelchair tennis
International Tennis Hall of Fame inductees
Medalists at the 1988 Summer Paralympics
Medalists at the 1992 Summer Paralympics
Medalists at the 1996 Summer Paralympics
ITF World Champions